Grimanesa Amorós (born in Lima, Peru) is a Peruvian-American artist known for large-scale light sculpture installations, where she draws inspiration from Peruvian cultural legacies and the communities surrounding her sculptures.

She has exhibited in Mexico, Tel Aviv, Beijing, and New York's Times Square.

Early life and career
Grimanesa Amorós was born in Lima, Peru, and she became fascinated with drawing maps at a young age. 
 In her teens, she studied psychology and art. She attended the Miguel Gayo Art Atelier in Lima, Peru. When Amorós was eighteen, she exhibited a sold-out show featuring her paintings.

Amorós moved to New York City to work as an artist in the 1980s. Once there, she was awarded a scholarship to study painting and printmaking at the Art Students League of New York.

She started as a painter but thought about painting in sculptural terms. This eventually lead her to move on to creating three-dimensional artworks.

Selected light installations / sculptures

Huanchaco Series

Golden Array (2021) 

Golden Array was commissioned by Jio World Drive for a cultural center in the Bandra Kurla Complex of Mumbai, India. The light sculpture is Amorós’ largest work at three blocks long and three stories high. The sculpture was inspired by the number of telephone lines found on Indian streets.

Argentum (2019) 

Argentum was commissioned by the Bronx Museum for their new location at 80 White Street. The work was created in stainless steel, inspired by the material's historic usage in the building and expansion of Manhattan.

Cetha (2019) 

Created as part of the artists’ residence at the Civita Institute in Civita Di Bagnoregio. Cetha is a red light sculpture inspired by the ancient Etruscan connection to the sun.

Hedera (2018) 

As part of its 40th anniversary, BRIC commissioned HEDERA, a large light installation for Prospect Park in New York. Amorós said she wanted the sculpture to bring viewers closer to a utopia in which people could “celebrate nature, diversity, creativity, and their shared humanity."

Ocupante (2016) 

In 2016 she exhibited the work title "Ocupante" at the Ludwig Museum Koblenz. The Ludwig Museum Koblenz exhibited three works of Amorós’ pieces; two large-scale installations and a video with the Spanish title "ocupante" - meaning occupiers or owners.

Pink Lotus (2015) 

Created for Breast Cancer Awareness Month LED lights sculpture installed on the Beaux-Arts façade of The Peninsula New York hotel. The artwork highlights the two Roman goddesses on the facade.

Golden Waters (2015) 
Golden Waters was inspired waterways constructed by the Hohokam tribe in the 13th century. The LED sculpture is a metaphor for the “shifting balance between the city and nature”.

Breathless Maiden Lane (2014) 
 Breathless Maiden Laneas an installation in the atrium of 125 Maiden Lane, a glass, marble and granite space in New York's Financial District. Amorós used LED lights, diffusive material, and "bubble" sculptures. The LED tubing was an allusion to reeds that grow in northern Peru, and the bubbles meant to suggest the artificial islands of Lake Titicaca. The light installation is a part of VIP The Armory Show (art fair) event.

The Mirror Connection (2013)
The Mirror Connection was a light sculpture installation which was opened June 2, 2013 and ran through June 22nd, 2013. It included exposed circuitry and unpredictable light patterns.

Fortuna (2013)

Fortuna was a temporary site-specific light installation located at Tabacalera in Madrid, Spain. Commissioned by Ministry of Education and Culture in Spain, Fortuna was named after the tobacco brand that was manufactured there in the former factory, La Fragua.

Uros Series

In her lighting sculptures, Amorós returns to the theme of the "Uros Islands", which are a series of floating islands in Lake Titicaca bordering Peru and Bolivia. The islands are made from dried totora reeds by the pre-Incan Uros people. When Amorós first visited the islands, she was struck by "the sense of weightlessness and spiritual connectivity" she experienced by walking on them.

The reeds are also used as a structural material to build everything from houses to boats in the Uros culture. Amorós has incorporated the shapes and patterns of these reeds into her lighting sculptures. 

Works in the series include:

Uros House in Times Square
Part of the Times Square Alliance Public Arts Program in collaboration with The Armory Show (art fair) This piece was later on being exhibited at the Paul and Lulu Hilliard University Art Museum at the University of Louisiana at Lafayette in Lafayette, Louisiana Uros House uses the traditional shape and design of the Uros islands houses to mirror the beauty of sea foam.

Uros Island at the 54th Venice Biennale (2011)
54th International Art Exhibition in Venice, Italy. Part of the Collateral Event FUTURE PASS

Uros Island, an installation by Grimanesa Amorós that was featured at the 54th Venice Biennale's International Art Exhibition. The exhibition traveled to Wereldmuseum in Rotterdam, National Taiwan Museum of Fine Arts in Taiwan and Today Art Museum in China.

Uros at Tribeca Issey Miyake (2011) 

The bubbles created a tension with the store's exoskeletal designed by Frank Gehry.

Golden Uros as part of the 2011 APART Festival
At the Chapelle de la Persévérance in Tarascon, France

Racimo (2010)

Amorós’ first large-scale lighting sculpture. Commissioned by ICART for Royal Caribbean International to create a lighting sculpture for Allure of the Seas, the largest cruise ship in the world.

Racimo is inspired by the vineyards the artist grew up near.

Collaborations
Amorós collaborated with the Biennale Des Antiquaires at the Grand Palais in Paris, France, to create the lighting sculpture piece, Timeless Motion (In Life and Light).

In 2014, Amorós collaborated with Akiko Elizabeth Maie, the newest label from Nepenthes AMERICA INC., presenting Onkochishin 2014.

Ivri Lider of The Young Professionals and Amorós collaborated on the soundtrack of her video, "Miranda". The video premiered with her sculpture, Light between the Islands in 2013.

Amorós worked with Afro-Peruvian singer and Peru's Minister of Culture, Susana Baca, in her video "Between Heaven and Earth". Baca produced an original score for the video, titled "Nacimiento de Voces" ("Birth Voices"). She also produced an interview documentary titled, La Conexion Perfecta de Susana Baca, which was used in Baca's concerts. Amorós' latest collaboration with Baca is the Baca's latest album in 2011, Afrodiaspora, where Amorós designed and used images of her artwork with photos of Susana in the CD packaging.

In her Rootless Algas video, she worked with Hilmar Orn Hilmarsson who produced an original score. The video exhibited with her installation of large multi-colored algae made by casting translucent abaca sheets.

In Reflexion Obscura she worked with José Luis Pardo - multiple-Grammy nominated and Latin Grammy Winning Los Amigos Invisibles on the score.

In La Incubadora she worked with multiple Grammy-nominated Meshell Ndegeocello.

In 2011, she did a special collaboration with fashion designer Manuel Fernandez in his "Fashion Art" show, creating a dress called "Precious Nipples".

Awards and grants

Amorós has received the Bronx Museum of the Arts: AIM Alumni Artist Award (NY), The National Endowment for the Arts Visual Artist Fellowship (Washington, DC), among others.

She was a TED global speaker in 2014.

References

External links
 
 Nina Menocal Gallery 
 Arte Al Limite

Feminist artists
American installation artists
Light artists
Peruvian women sculptors
American women sculptors
Living people
People from Lima
Artists from New York City
20th-century American artists
1962 births
Peruvian sculptors
Peruvian emigrants to the United States
Sculptors from New York (state)
21st-century American women artists
20th-century American women artists
20th-century Peruvian artists
21st-century Peruvian artists
Public art in Mumbai